Kim Hong-yeon (born June 12, 1990) is a North Korean football player.

Club statistics
Updated to 23 February 2018.

References

External links
Profile at Fukushima United FC

1990 births
Living people
Association football people from Aichi Prefecture
North Korean footballers
J3 League players
Japan Football League players
Fukushima United FC players
Iwate Grulla Morioka players
Vanraure Hachinohe players
Nara Club players
Association football forwards